Rey Ramsey is an American social justice entrepreneur, author, and the former CEO of the One Economy Corporation, a nonprofit he co-founded in 2000.

Ramsey received a B.A. in political science from Rutgers University, where he was a member of Cap and Skull, and ZBT fraternity, and a J.D. degree from the University of Virginia School of Law.

After graduating from law school, Ramsey went to work for the Portland law-firm Stoel Rives. He soon left his job at the firm to pursue a career with the Oregon State Economic Development Department, where he was director of the Oregon Housing and Community Services Department under governors Neil Goldschmidt and Barbara Roberts. Ramsey then worked for the Enterprise Community Partners, first as senior vice president and later became president.

Ramsey served two terms on the Habitat for Humanity International board of directors, elected as vice-chairman in 2001 and then as chairman in 2003. During his chairmanship, the board fired Habitat founder Millard Fuller. Ramsey is currently on the board of the Local Initiatives Support Corporation and the Washington Jesuit Academy.

Ramsey has been a proponent of the Portland citywide wireless initiative.

Bibliography
 Managing Nonprofits.org: Dynamic Management for the Digital Age (J. Wiley & Sons, 2002). . Co-authored with Ben Hecht.

References

External links
 One Economy Corporation - Rey Ramsey Bio

1960 births
American computer businesspeople
Businesspeople from Portland, Oregon
Living people
People from Waterford Township, New Jersey
Rutgers University alumni
University of Virginia School of Law alumni